"Le Dernier qui a parlé..." ("The last to have spoken...")  is a song written and performed in French by Amina, to music by Wasis Diop. It was 's entry in the Eurovision Song Contest 1991, performed as "C'est le dernier qui a parlé qui a raison" ("It's the last to have spoken who is right").

Eurovision Song Contest
The full title of the song was one of the longest in the contest's history alongside Man gewöhnt sich so schnell an das Schöne which represented Germany in 1964 until they were succeeded by The Social Network Song (Oh Oh - Uh - Oh Oh) which represented San Marino in 2012. The song was written by Amina herself and composed by Wasis Diop. Lyrically, Amina sings about the truth of the saying referenced in the title. She also extends it to "it's the loudest one to have spoken who is right".

The song was performed ninth on the night, following 's Carola with "Fångad av en stormvind" and preceding 's İzel Çeliköz, Reyhan Karaca & Can Uğurluer with "İki Dakika". At the close of voting, it had received 146 points, placing 2nd in a field of 22. It had tied for the first place, but the tie-break rules gave the win to Sweden.

The song was succeeded as French representative at the 1992 contest by Kali with "Monté la riviè".

Track listings
 CD single
 "Le Dernier qui a parlé..." — 3:10
 "Neila" — 4:25

 CD maxi
 "Le Dernier qui a parlé..." (remix) — 4:36
 "Neila" — 4:25
 "Le Dernier qui a parlé..." — 3:16
	
 7" single
 "Le Dernier qui a parlé..." — 3:10
 "Neila" — 4:25

Charts

External links
 Official Eurovision Song Contest site, history by year, 1991
 Detailed info & lyrics, The Diggiloo Thrush, "C'est le dernier qui a parlé qui a raison".

References

1991 singles
Amina Annabi songs
Eurovision songs of 1991
Eurovision songs of France
1991 songs
Philips Records singles